The Iowa PGA Championship is a golf tournament that is the championship of the Iowa section of the PGA of America.  Although the section was founded in 1916, the records of the Iowa section show tournament winners only back to 1953. Bob Fry, holds the record for most victories with five. Richie Karl, who won the B.C. Open on the PGA Tour, won this event four consecutive times, from 1982 to 1985.

Winners 

 2022 Jay Giannetto
 2021 Sean McCarty
 2020 Chad Proehl
 2019 Judd Gibb
 2018 Darin Fisher
 2017 Chad Proehl
 2016 Darin Fisher
 2015 Ryan McClintock
 2014 Zack Vervaecke
 2013 Aaron Krueger
 2012 Sean McCarty
 2011 Chris Black
 2010 Chad Proehl
 2009 Judd Gibb
 2008 Aaron Krueger
 2007 Curt Schnell
 2006 John Bermel
 2005 Steve Reilly
 2004 John Bermel
 2003 Chris Winkel
 2002 Chris Winkel
 2001 Kevin DeNike
 2000 John Bermel
 1999 Chris Winkel
 1998 Craig Miller
 1997 Ken DeNike
 1996 Curt Schnell
 1995 Ken Schall
 1994 Greg Ladehoff
 1993 John Bermel
 1992 Lynn Blevins
 1991 Jack Richards
 1990 Ken Schall
 1989 Ken Schall
 1988 Ken Schall
 1987 Steve Groves
 1986 J. D. Turner
 1985 Richie Karl
 1984 Richie Karl
 1983 Richie Karl
 1982 Richie Karl
 1981 Bob Moreland
 1980 Dave Hilgenberg
 1979 Bill Galloway
 1978 Craig Bunker
 1977 Bill Galloway
 1976 Bob Moreland
 1975 Hank Stukart
 1974 Bob Fry
 1973 Tim Sweborg
 1972 Hank Stukart
 1971 Steve Gragg
 1970 Jack Webb
 1969 Jack Webb
 1968 Gary Lockie
 1967 Larry Crawford
 1966 Bob Fry
 1965 Bob Fry
 1964 Jack Hall
 1963 Bob Fry
 1962 Bob Shields
 1961 Bob Shields
 1960 Don Palmer
 1959 Bob Fry
 1958 Jack Jones
 1957 Don Palmer
 1956 Don Palmer
 1955 Don Palmer
 1954 Joe Brown
 1953 Frank Bubany

Source:

References

External links 
PGA of America – Iowa section

Golf in Iowa
PGA of America sectional tournaments
Recurring sporting events established in 1953